Union Township is one of four townships in Ohio County, Indiana, United States. As of the 2010 census, its population was 504 and it contained 219 housing units.

Geography
Union is the smallest township by area in the state.

Unincorporated towns
 Hartford at 
 Milton at 
(This list is based on USGS data and may include former settlements.)

School districts
 Rising Sun-Ohio County Community Schools

Political districts
 State House District 68
 State Senate District 43

References
 
 United States Census Bureau 2009 TIGER/Line Shapefiles
 IndianaMap

External links
 Indiana Township Association
 United Township Association of Indiana
 City-Data.com page for Union Township

Townships in Ohio County, Indiana
Townships in Indiana